
Gmina Stęszew is an urban-rural gmina (administrative district) in Poznań County, Greater Poland Voivodeship, in west-central Poland.

Villages
Apart from the town of Stęszew, Gmina Stęszew contains the villages and settlements of Będlewo, Dębienko, Dębno, Drogosławiec, Drożdżyce, Górka, Jeziorki, Krąplewo, Łódź, Mirosławki, Modrze, Piekary, Rybojedzko, Sapowice, Skrzynki, Słupia, Smętówko, Srocko Małe, Strykówko, Strykowo, Tomice, Tomiczki, Trzebaw, Twardowo, Wielka Wieś, Witobel, Wronczyn, Zamysłowo and Zaparcin.

Neighbouring gminas
Gmina Stęszew is bordered by the gminas of Buk, Czempiń, Dopiewo, Granowo, Kamieniec, Komorniki, Kościan and Mosina.

References
Polish official population figures 2006

Steszew
Poznań County